Hemipilia forrestii is a species of plant in the family Orchidaceae. It is endemic to China. It was named in honour of George Forrest (1873-1932).

References

Endemic orchids of China
forrestii
Vulnerable plants
Taxonomy articles created by Polbot